A hong originally designates both a type of building and a type of Chinese merchant intermediary in Guangzhou (formerly  known as Canton), Guangdong, China, in the 18–19th century, specifically during the Canton System period.

Guangzhou

The name hong originally referred to the row of factories built outside of the city walls of Guangzhou 广州 (Canton), near the Pearl River. The Thirteen Factories were used during the Canton System period to host foreign traders and the products purchased, under the aegis of the cohong.  The Hong (or Factories) were usually owned by hong merchants such as Pan Zhencheng (Poankeequa 1). 

The Guangzhou Hong changed location several times after fires, and became less important after the First Opium War (18391842), as Guangzhou lost its monopoly of foreign trade and Hong Kong was ceded to the British as a colony.

Hong Kong
In Hong Kong, the name hong designated major business houses. One of the earliest foreign hongs established in Hong Kong was Jardine Matheson & Co., who bought Lot No. 1 at the first Hong Kong land sale in 1841. In 1843 the same firm established a mainland China headquarters on the Bund in Shanghai, just south of the British Consulate. The building was known as "the Ewo Hong", or "Ewo House", based on the Cantonese pronunciation of the company's Chinese name (怡和行, Cantonese: Yiwo Hong, now 怡和洋行). Jardines took the name from the earlier Ewo hong run by Howqua near Whampoa, Canton.

The term is most often used in reference to colonial Hong Kong companies directly.

Prior to the establishment of banking institutions other than small foreign bank branches, the three firms that financed most of Hong Kong's economic activities were Jardine's, Dent's and Russell's. Most of these firms became multinational corporations with management consisting of mostly European expatriates.

By the time of the handover of Hong Kong to China in 1997, many of the hongs had diversified their holdings and shifted their headquarters offshore away from Hong Kong to avoid potential takeover by the Chinese Communist Party.

Conglomerates of colonial Hong Kong
Note: Below are lists of companies that had a predominant effect on Hong Kong's economy at a particular era. Their noteworthiness is debatable. The official names of the era are used.

1843
 12 large British firms
 Six Indian Parsee companies – including D.M. Rustomjee
 One American company – Augustine Heard and Company

1844
 Jardine Matheson
 Dent & Co.

1850s
 Russell & Co – US company founded by Samuel Russell in Canton in 1824 for the opium trade; acquired J & T H Perkins of Boston in 1830, established Hong Kong office 1850
 Wheelock Marden 1857

1860s
 Gilman and Bowman – established by Richard James Gilman as a tea trader in 1840; taken over by Duncan Paterson of Australia 1917 and turned into a privately held company; bought by Inchcape Group in 1969

1870s
 Butterfield and Swire
 Adamson Bell and Company; transformed into Dodwell, Carlill & Co. in 1891 by George Benjamin Dodwell; changed name to Dodwell & Co. in 1899; bought by Inchcape Group in 1972
 The Wharf (Holdings)

1890s
 Jebsen & Co.

See also
 Economy of Hong Kong
 Nam Pak Hong
 The Hongkong and Shanghai Banking Corporation
 Hang Seng Index
 Old China Trade
 Sogo shosha, Japan
 Zaibatsu, Japan
 Keiretsu, Japan
 Chaebol, South Korea
 Four big families of Hong Kong
 English Chartered Trading Companies, England/Britain -including fur trading company Hudson's Bay Company
 Cohong
 Ten Great Merchant Guilds

References

Further reading
 Waters, Dan: "Hong Kong Hongs with Long Histories and British Connections", Paper presented at the 12th Conference of the International Association of Historians of Asia, at Hong Kong University (June 1991)

External links
Profit Proffs in China
ProfitOnline Recenze

Economic history of China
China–United States economic relations
History of Hong Kong
History of foreign trade in China
Economy of Hong Kong